Walter Sandza (born 9 August 1956) is a Puerto Rican alpine skier. He competed in two events at the 1988 Winter Olympics.

References

1956 births
Living people
Puerto Rican male alpine skiers
Olympic alpine skiers of Puerto Rico
Alpine skiers at the 1988 Winter Olympics
Place of birth missing (living people)